Errors are a three piece "post-electro" band from Glasgow, Scotland. They are signed to Rock Action Records, the label founded and managed by the band Mogwai.

History 
The band was formed as a bedroom electronic-based project in Glasgow in 2004 by members Simon Ward, Greg Paterson and Stephen Livingstone.  They were signed by Post-Rock band Mogwai to their Rock Action Records imprint who released a limited run 7" single "Hans Herman".

The band followed up their debut with the 'How Clean is your Acid House? EP in 2006. Following the release of the EP, the band recruited former Multiplies and Dananananaykroyd drummer James Hamilton, who had been performing as a live member of the band, to the band as a full-time member. In summer 2007 they supported UK dance band Underworld on a UK tour.

Their debut album It's Not Something But It Is Like Whatever was released on Rock Action records in June 2008. The quartet's debut album wrought comparisons in some quarters to US band Battles among others. The band also toured extensively throughout 2008 with Forward Russia, 65daysofstatic and Mogwai. They spent the first part of 2009 touring Europe, playing at the 2009 Eurosonic festival and extensively supporting Mogwai and Danish electro-rock band Whomadewho on separate tours. In 2010 the band released their second full-length album Come Down With Me on Rock Action records, the title of which is a play on the popular Channel 4 television series 'Come Dine with Me', and spent the Spring and Summer touring extensively throughout the UK and Europe.
In October 2010 Errors toured the UK as Co-Headline act with fellow Scots The Twilight Sad and released a remix album titled 'Celebrity Come Down With Me', featuring remixes of tracks from their previous album by artists including Gold Panda and Ceephax Acid Crew.

In March 2011, Errors were invited to perform at the South By Southwest festival. In April/May 2011 Errors embarked upon a tour of the United States and Canada supporting Mogwai, during which Errors drummer James Hamilton filled in on drums for the headliners. In December 2011 Errors played their last full show with guitarist and founding member Greg Paterson, supporting Mogwai at Glasgow's Barrowlands (Paterson would later re-join the band onstage at a secret show in their native Glasgow, the band's only live date during a year-long hiatus in 2013).

In 2012, the three piece Errors released two albums, Have Some Faith in Magic and an eight track mini-album New Relics which was released on a limited edition VHS cassette, and embarked upon an extensive touring schedule of the UK, Europe and North America.

In 2014, the band played their first shows in Japan, supporting fellow Glaswegians Chvrches and playing the Hostess Club Weekender in Tokyo. and began work on their fourth full-length studio album "Lease of Life" which was released on 23 March 2015.

Band members 

Current members
 Simon Ward – guitars, keys, programming
 Stephen Livingstone – guitars, vocals, keys, programming
 James Hamilton – drums

Past members
 Greg Paterson – guitars, keys, vocals (2004–2011)

Collaborative members
 George Pringle – vocals
 Bek Olivia – vocals
 Cecilia Stamp – vocals

Discography

Albums
It's Not Something But It Is Like Whatever (2008, Rock Action Records)
Come Down With Me (2010, Rock Action Records)
Have Some Faith in Magic (2012, Rock Action Records)
New Relics (2012, Rock Action Records)
Lease of Life (2015, Rock Action Records)

EPs
How Clean is Your Acid House? (2006, Rock Action Records)
Celebrity Come Down With Me (2010, Rock Action Records)

Singles
"Hans Herman" / "Ah-Ha-Ha" (2005, Rock Action Records)
"H.E.B.S." / "Fly For" (Split 7" single with Findo Gask) (2005, Too Many Fireworks)
"Salut! France" / "Maeve Binchy" (2007, Rock Action Records)
"Toes" / "Period Drama" (2008, Rock Action Records)
"Pump" (Edit) / "Toes" (Dolby Anol Remix) (2008, Rock Action Records)
"A Rumour in Africa" / "Beat The Bookies"  (2010, Rock Action Records)
"Magna Encarta" / "Ganymede" (2011, Rock Action Records)
"Pleasure Palaces" / "Auberchute Flyer" (2012, Rock Action Records)

References

Musical groups from Glasgow
Rock Action Records artists